Polenecia is a genus of spiders in the family Uloboridae. It was first described in 1967 by Lehtinen. , it contains only one species, Polenecia producta, with a range of "Mediterranean to Azerbaijan".

References

Uloboridae
Monotypic Araneomorphae genera
Spiders of Asia
Taxa named by Pekka T. Lehtinen